The 24th European Film Awards were presented on 3 December 2011 in Berlin, Germany. The winners were selected by the over 2,500 members of the European Film Academy.

Winners and nominees
The nominations for the 24th European Film Awards were announced on 5 November.

Best Film

Best Director

Best Actress

Best Actor

Best Screenwriter

Best Cinematographer

Best Editor

Best Production Designer

Best Composer

Best Documentary

Best Animated Feature Film
The nominees for Best Animated Feature Film were selected by a committee consisting of EFA Board Members and representatives from the European Association of Animation Film.

Discovery – Prix FIPRESCI
The nominees for best feature-film debut were selected by a committee consisting of representatives from EFA and the International Federation of Film Critics.

Best Short Film
The nominees for Best Short Film were selected by independent juries at a series of film festivals throughout Europe.

People's Choice Award
The winner of the People's Choice Award was selected by online votes.

See also
 2011 in film
 Cinema of Europe
 List of film awards

References

External links
 List of films in selection , press release from the European Film Academy

2011 film awards
2011 in German cinema
European Film Awards ceremonies
2011 in Europe
2011 in Berlin